A somma volcano, also known as a sommian, is a volcanic caldera that has been partially filled by a new central cone. Mount Somma is a stratovolcano in southern Italy with a summit caldera in which the upper cone of Mount Vesuvius has grown.

Other examples of somma volcanoes can be found on Russia's Kamchatka Peninsula and the Kuril Islands, stretching south from Kamchatka to Hokkaidō, Japan.

The Somma volcano is located in the Campania region of southern Italy, near the city of Naples, and is believed to have formed over 25,000 years ago. The volcano has a collapsed caldera of an older volcano, with Mount Vesuvius rising up from the center. Both the Somma volcano and Mount Vesuvius are part of the Campanian volcanic arc, which is known for its high levels of seismic and volcanic activity. Despite the potential dangers associated with living near an active volcano, the Somma volcano and its surroundings are a popular tourist destination, attracting visitors from around the world who come to see its unique geology and learn about the region's fascinating history.

Some examples of somma volcanoes are the following:

 Africa
 Pico do Fogo (Fogo Island, Cape Verde)
 Teide (Tenerife, Canary Islands, Spain)
 Americas
 Cosigüina (Chinandega, Nicaragua)
 Wizard Island (Oregon, United States)
 Lava domes (Mount St. Helens, Washington, United States)
 Asia
 Ebeko (Paramushir Island, Kuril Islands, Russia)
 Gunung Baru Jari (Segara Anak caldera, Lombok, Indonesia)
 Kolokol Group: Kolokol, Berg, Borzov, Trezubetz (Urup Island, Kuril Islands, Russia)
 Anak Krakatoa (Krakatoa archipelago, Sunda Strait, Lampung, Indonesia): a partially-submerged nested somma volcano (with a central cone within a caldera which is itself within a larger caldera).
 Krenitsyn Peak (Tao-Rusyr caldera, Onekotan Island, Kuril Islands, Russia)
 Medvezhya (Iturup Island, Kuril Islands, Russia)
 Milna (Simushir Island, Kuril Islands, Russia)
 Pinatubo (Central Luzon, Philippines)
 Taal Volcano (Batangas Province, Philippines)
 Tengger caldera (East Java, Indonesia)
 Tondano caldera (North Sulawesi, Indonesia)
 Sakurajima (Aira caldera, Kyūshū, Japan)
 Tyatya (Kunashir Island, Kuril Islands, Russia)
 Urataman (Simushir Island, Kuril Islands, Russia)
 Zarechny (Kamchatka Peninsula, Russia)
 Europe
 Nea Kameni (Santorini caldera, Greece): a partially-submerged somma volcano
 Mount Pico (Azores, Portugal)
 Mount Vesuvius (Campania, Italy)
 Oceania 
 Mount Gharat (Gaua, Vanuatu)

See also
 Crater lake

Volcanology